Lourenço Soares de Valladares, Lord of Valadares and Tangil (c.1230–1298) was a Portuguese nobleman, who served in the Court of Afonso III as Tenente of Ribeira do Minho and Mayor of the Palace.

He was the son of Soeiro Aires de Valadares (descendant of Aires Nunes) and Estevainha Ponce de Baião. His first wife was Maria Mendes de Sousa, a noble woman, descendant of Count Mendo de Sousa and Sueiro Belfaguer.

References

External links 

1230s births
1298 deaths
13th-century Portuguese people
Portuguese nobility
Portuguese Roman Catholics